Huo Kuizhang (1901 - 1953) was a KMT general from Hunan. He was appointed a major general on April 13, 1935, and promoted to lieutenant general in May 1937. He commanded the 20th Army Group from July 1940 to June 1945. He fought against the Imperial Japanese Army in Changsha, Yunnan and Burma.

External links

National Revolutionary Army generals from Hunan
1953 deaths
1901 births